Central Place is a mixed-use development in Arlington, Virginia, consisting primarily of Central Place Tower (headquarters of Gartner) to the south, and a residential tower to the north, with a plaza between them.

History
Design began in 2002 and construction was set to begin in 2008, but was delayed to 2014 due to the Great Recession. The complex is located directly above the Rosslyn station of the Washington Metro and some bedrock, presenting engineering challenges.

See also
List of tallest buildings in Arlington, Virginia
List of tallest buildings in Virginia

References

Buildings and structures in Arlington County, Virginia